Bristol Coanda biplane may refer to  number of different aircraft designed by Henri Coanda for the Bristol Aeroplane Company:

Bristol B.R.7
Bristol T.B.8
Bristol P.B.8 pusher